Bellingham is a town in Norfolk County, Massachusetts, United States. The population was 16,945 at the 2020 census. The town sits on the southwestern fringe of Metropolitan Boston, along the rapidly growing "outer belt" that is Route 495. It is formally a part of the Boston–Cambridge–Quincy metropolitan statistical area, as well as the Providence metropolitan area.

For geographic and demographic information on the census-designated place Bellingham, please see the article Bellingham (CDP), Massachusetts.

History
The area of the town south of the Charles River constituted the southwestern corner of the Dedham Grant, which sprouted much of what has become Norfolk County. The land was swampy, and the town of Dedham did not believe it worthy of settlement. The area north of the river would be purchased by Edward Rawson, and due to the settlement of borders with the surrounding communities, these two areas would eventually merge. Most of the land to be called Bellingham was originally a portion of Dedham. The first land bought in Bellingham that was Dedham was purchased in 1696 by a man who believed that that government is best which governs least. By 1713, there were enough citizens to warrant village meetings in the area. By 1718, the village petitioned for separation, and the town officially incorporated on November 27, 1719. The village was originally named "Westham" (short for "West Dedham"), but at the time of incorporation, its name was changed to Bellingham without record of the benefactor.  The town is named for Richard Bellingham, an early governor of the Massachusetts Bay Colony.

The town was founded with a Pilgrim (Congregationalist) meeting house, like all the towns in the colony at the time. However, this church would dissolve before the middle of the century, replaced with a Baptist church. John Leland, a Baptist minister, who was a major supporter of James Madison and the First Amendment to the Constitution, was baptized in Bellingham's Baptist church in 1775. The town grew slowly, given the terrain and the limited resources. During the Industrial Revolution, several man-made ponds were constructed to support industry in land that had been swamp. Today the northern part of the town is part of the economic boom along I-495, with the southern being mostly suburban. Deborah Sampson enlisted as "Robert Shurtlieff" at Bellingham, near the end of the Revolutionary War, and disguised herself as a man, to become America's first woman soldier.

Geography and transportation
According to the United States Census Bureau, the town has a total area of 19.0 square miles (49.2 km2), of which 18.5 square miles (47.9 km2) is land and 0.5 square mile (1.3 km2) (2.58%) is water. The town's mean elevation is 293 feet (89 m) above sea level.

Bellingham is located at the southwestern corner of Norfolk County, just northwest of the northeast corner of Rhode Island. It is bordered by Medway on the north, Franklin to the east, Wrentham to the southeast; Woonsocket, Rhode Island, on the south; and Blackstone, Hopedale and Mendon to the west, and Milford to the northwest. Bellingham is 23 miles (37 km) southeast of Worcester, 30 miles (50 km) southwest of Boston, and 20 miles (30 km) north of Providence, Rhode Island.

Interstate 495 runs across the north end of town, with only one exit in the town itself, Exit 46 (Formerly 18) at Hartford Avenue (Rte. 126). Exits 41 and 43 (Formerly 16 and 17) in Franklin are just a few miles from the town line.  3 miles (5 km)  State Route 126 runs north to south from the town of Medway to the Rhode Island border. State Route 140 runs east to west from Franklin to Mendon. The town went from having no traffic lights in the late 1980s to well over a dozen in 2006.

The town currently has no mode of public transportation of its own. The nearest small craft airport is at the Hopedale Industrial Park Airport, just over the town line along Route 140. The Worcester Regional Airport is twenty-eight miles away, and the nearest national air service can be reached at T. F. Green Airport, thirty miles away. The nearest international airport is Boston's Logan International Airport, 35 miles (56 km) away. There is no rail service in town; however, the MBTA's Franklin Line terminates just 2 miles (3 km) from the town line at Forge Park/I-495 in Franklin, and approximately 5 miles (8 km) from the town center.

The neighboring city of Woonsocket, Rhode Island had proposed a plan to bring commuter rail service to the area which would require an extension of the MBTA Franklin line. Commuter rail service to the Greater Woonsocket area would essentially bring the rail line through the town of Bellingham, Blackstone, and terminating in Woonsocket, bringing an increased amount of tourism to the area, and increasing ridership in persons commuting to the city of Boston and Logan Airport. A study was conducted in 2007 on whether or not it would be feasible to expand the Franklin line westward; the results of which were determined that rehabilitating the old abandoned rail line would cost too much money and not bring enough benefit to the area. However, as the population grows in this general area, it is most likely that the MBTA will not drop plans for such an extension.

Demographics

As of the census of 2000, there were 15,314 people, 5,557 households, and 4,284 families residing in the town. The racial makeup of the town was 96.93% White, 0.91% Black, 0.12% (U.S. Census) American Indian, 0.86% Asian, 0.03% Pacific Islander, 0.30% from other races, and 0.84% from two or more races. Hispanic or Latino of any race were 1.20% of the population.

65.53% of the people in Bellingham, Massachusetts are religious, meaning they affiliate with a religion. 54.17% are Catholic; 6.63% are Baptist; 0.19% are LDS; 0.87% are of another Christian faith; 2.98% are Jewish; 0.26% are an Eastern faith; 0.70% are affiliated with Islam. There are a number of meetinghouses in Bellingham; two Catholic churches, St. Blaise and St. Brendan's; three Baptist churches, Bellingham Bible Baptist, Milford Bible Baptist and First Baptist; and one Hindu temple the Boston Sri Kalikambal Shiva Temple. People of Buddhist, Jewish, Mennonite, Mormon, or Muslim faiths meet in neighboring towns for worship.

There were 5,557 households, out of which 37.9% had children under the age of 18 living with them, 64.6% were married couples living together, 8.9% had a female householder with no husband present, and 22.9% were non-families. 18.2% of all households were made up of individuals, and 6.1% had someone living alone who was 65 years of age or older. The average household size was 2.75 and the average family size was 3.15.

In the town, the population was spread out, with 26.8% under the age of 18, 5.6% from 18 to 24, 34.6% from 25 to 44, 23.3% from 45 to 64, and 9.7% who were 65 years of age or older. The median age was 36 years. For every 100 females, there were 96.1 males. For every 100 females age 18 and over, there were 94.2 males.

The median income for a household in the town was $103,258 . The per capita income for the town was $44,236. 2020 Census quick facts 
About 1.6% of families and 2.5% of the population were below the poverty line, including 2.5% of those under age 18 and 6.0% of those age 65 or over.

Crime 

The FBI Crime Database states that out of Massachusetts' 279 cities and towns, Bellingham was ranked 87th in Most Property Damage per 100,000 in 2013.  However, it was ranked 122nd for Most Burglaries per 100,000.  Some of the cities with the highest crime rates in the state include Fall River and Springfield. There are also 7 confirmed sex offenders living in Bellingham as of 2015.

Commerce
The town had never experienced any large growth until 1993, when Wal-Mart opened a store along Hartford Avenue (route 126), near the 495 interchange. This opened the doors to an explosive growth, with major retailers like Home Depot, Barnes & Noble, Staples, Gap, Old Navy, Regal Cinemas, Chili's, Michael's, Game Stop, Whole Foods Market, DeMoulas' Market Basket, A.C. Moore, Party City, and Outback Steakhouse to sign long-term leases. After the closure of Newbury Comics, a Verizon Wireless and Coldstone Creamery (now Supercuts) opened in the Charles River Center (however, Newbury Comics reopened in the same plaza in September 2010). In December 2006, Decathlon closed its doors in the Crossroads Center, opening up 30,000 s.f. of available space, now occupied by Bob's Discount Furniture store. Most recently, the town has been in talks with S.R. Weiner of Chestnut Hill, Massachusetts to develop a 1,150,000 square foot (107,000 m2) "lifestyle center" to be called the "Shoppes at Bellingham" that would include upscale shops and restaurants like Crate & Barrel, Williams Sonoma, or Legal Sea Foods; hotels, and office space on North Main Street behind Home Depot. The buildings will primarily be one level and encourage pedestrian traffic, have lush landscaping, and restaurants with outdoor dining facilities. While it is common for "lifestyle centers" to have accessible parking close to the stores, a large parking structure is planned for the rear of the property. Although not yet in development, planning is underway for a new highway interchange and rerouting of Route 126, and Phase One of the project was to have opened in late 2008 or early 2009. There have been numerous talks and meetings between the Bellingham Planning Board and the developers for the Shoppes, as concerns about traffic have been voiced by numerous residents and businesses. Despite the economic downturn in 2009, plans for the Shoppes continue as the developers await construction of a new highway interchange, currently scheduled to begin in Fall 2018.

As of December 30, 2006, the town created the Pulaski Boulevard Village Overlay District Subcommittee to develop the downtrodden southern portion of the town with a mix of retail shops, homes, and condominiums in a "downtown feel." After the Archdiocese of Boston closed and sold Assumption Parish in 2005, the town has looked at many different options to revitalize its southern end (and a stark contrast to its northern, where most of the development is located). The newest of development along this 2 mile (3 km) stretch of road (from the Rhode Island border to Crooks Corner) is the newly opened Stop & Shop along the Blackstone border. A CVS/Pharmacy also opened across the street replacing a vet clinic. Public meetings and debate are currently underway to discuss the options for development, along with a revitalization plan for the Town Center, where construction continues to re-develop the route 140 and 126 intersection, where a second Walgreens pharmacy opened in early 2007.  Cumberland Farms was opened in the early part of 2016 going in a vacant lot next to Rocky's Ace Hardware.

Other developments are in the works, such as the new plaza along South Main Street with the towns third Dunkin' Donuts; and a fourth Dunkin' Donuts on Hartford Avenue.

During 2007, a mini-golf course was torn down, giving way to a moderate sized development at the intersection of Mechanic Street (140) and Maple Street near the Franklin town border and the MBTA Forge Park Station that includes a gas station, a fifth Dunkin' Donuts, a D'Angelo Sandwich Shops(which has since closed and a Subway resides in its location), a self-storage facility, a martial arts school, a jeweler, a pizza joint, a bakery, and Friendly Neighborhood Comics.  A free standing building in the same parking lot houses PJ's Bar and Grille, a beauty salon and Fusion Express.

The first Cumberland Farms was located in Bellingham on Pulaski Blvd in 1957.

Education 

As of current, there are two elementary schools (Stallbrook, and DiPietro), one middle school (Bellingham Memorial), and 2 high schools (Bellingham High School and Keough Memorial Academy). The Clara Macy Elementary school was closed before the start of the 2015–2016 school year and was demolished the following year. The children that attended Clara Macy school in the 2014–2015 school year were divided geographically between the remaining two elementary schools. Joseph F. DiPietro Elementary School was formally known as South Elementary school for the majority of its history. In 2019 Bellingham High School ranked 205 in Massachusetts as a result many families elect to school choice to nearby towns of Medway and Holliston or go to private and technical schools, Tri-County in Franklin, Blackstone Valley Tech in Upton, and Mount St. Charles in Woonsocket, RI. Bellingham High's sports teams have competed in the Tri-Valley League since the leagues induction in 1966. Bellingham is known for producing good baseball, softball and football teams but are considered an easy win in other sports by the other members of the league.

Cemeteries 

 Precious Blood & St. John, 314 Wrentham Rd
 St. John's Cemetery, 310 Wrentham Rd
 Ukrainian-American Cemetery, 128 Center St
 Union Cemetery, 84 Mechanic St
 North Cemetery and Oak Hill Cemetery, Hartford Ave

Notable people

 William Taylor Adams (1822–1897), author under the name "Oliver Optic" is from nearby Medway
 Bathsheba A. Benedict, founder of Benedict College
 Geoff Bodine, NASCAR Driver
 Levi Cook, mayor of Detroit
 Jason DeLucia, mixed martial artist
 John Leland, Baptist minister, baptized in Bellingham in 1774
 Debbie Mueller, pioneer female road runner, winner of Dublin Marathon
 Deborah Sampson, "America's first woman soldier" enlisted for service in the Revolutionary War at Bellingham
 Ricky Santos, American football player signed by the Kansas City Chiefs but spent the majority of his career playing in the CFL
 John Milton Thayer, Union Army general, US Senator from Nebraska

See also 
 National Register of Historic Places listings in Norfolk County, Massachusetts

References

Further reading
 George F. Partridge, History of the Town of Bellingham Massachusetts, 1719-1919. Bellingham, MA: Town of Bellingham, 1919.

External links

 Town of Bellingham

Towns in Massachusetts
Towns in Norfolk County, Massachusetts
1713 establishments in Massachusetts